Albino Binda (9 April 1904 – 30 March 1976) was an Italian racing cyclist. He won stage 8 of the 1928 Giro d'Italia.

References

External links
 

1904 births
1976 deaths
Italian male cyclists
Italian Giro d'Italia stage winners
Cyclists from the Province of Varese
People from Cittiglio